Green Valley Road may refer to:

 Green Valley Road (Maryland), also the unsigned Maryland Route 75
 Green Valley Road (California), part of California State Route 46